Satterfield is a surname. Notable people with the surname include: 

Bob Satterfield, American boxer
Bob Satterfield, American editorial cartoonist
Brian Satterfield, American football player
David Satterfield (disambiguation), multiple people
Doris Satterfield, American baseball player
Erbey Satterfield, American politician
Jimmy  Satterfield, American head football coach
Kenny Satterfield, American basketball player
Murray Satterfield, American college basketball coach
Paul Satterfield, American actor
Scott Satterfield, American football coach

Fictional characters:
Lieutenant Satterfield, character in the television series Stargate SG-1